The following is a list of notable earthquakes or tremors that happened in Ghana. So far it has been recorded that the worst earthquake Ghana has ever experienced was in 1939, which occurred in Accra, located in the Greater Accra Region killing 17 people and damaging a lot of properties.

Earthquake data 
For earthquakes prior to the modern era, the magnitude and epicentre location are only approximate, and were calculated based on available reports from the time. The magnitude where given is measured using the Richter scale unless stated otherwise.

References

Ghana
Earthquakes